William Ervin "Cap" Murrah (September 5, 1900 – June 1, 1956) was a professional football player who spent two years of the National Football League with the Canton Bulldogs and the St. Louis All-Stars. Murrah was a part of the Bulldogs' 1922 NFL championship team. In 1923, he played for the All-Stars. He played college football at Texas A&M University. Cap later was inducted into the Texas A&M Hall of Fame. While at A&M, Maurrah helped the Aggies win the 1922 Dixie Classic, when he recovered the football at the Centre College Praying Colonels' thirty-three yard line, setting up a touchdown on the possession.

Notes

References

External links

1900 births
Players of American football from Texas
Canton Bulldogs players
St. Louis All-Stars players
Texas A&M Aggies football players
1956 deaths